Peter Oliver (1594 – December 1648) was an English miniaturist.

Born in Isleworth, Middlesex, he was the eldest son of Isaac Oliver, a French-born English portrait miniature painter, probably by his first wife. When he died, Isaac Oliver left his finished and unfinished drawings for Peter, with the hope that he would live to exercise the art of his father. Isaac's other sons appear to have been under-age at the time of his death, and were probably therefore by a later wife than Peter's mother. Peter Oliver resided at Isleworth, and was buried beside his father at St Annes, Blackfriars.

He was even more eminent in miniature painting than his father, and is specially remarkable for a series of copies in watercolor he made after celebrated pictures by old masters. Most of these were done by the desire of the king, and seven of them still remain at Windsor Castle. A great many of Oliver's works were purchased by Charles II from his widow; several of his drawings are in existence, and a leaf from his pocket-book in the collection of the earl of Derby. His most important work is the group of the three grandsons of Anthony Browne, 1st Viscount Montague with their servant, now belonging to the marquess of Exeter; and there are fine miniatures by him at Welbeck Abbey, Montagu House, Sherborne Castle, Minley Manor, Belvoir Castle and in the private collection of Queen Wilhelmina.

Notes

References

External links

Miniatures by Peter Oliver (National Portrait Gallery, London)

1594 births
1648 deaths
17th-century English painters
English male painters
English watercolourists
Portrait miniaturists